Maxime Edouard Gaëtan Piaggio (22 August 1878 – 6 February 1909) was a French rower. He competed in the men's single sculls event at the 1900 Summer Olympics.

References

External links

1878 births
1909 deaths
French male rowers
Olympic rowers of France
Rowers at the 1900 Summer Olympics
Sportspeople from Yvelines
French emigrants to Switzerland